The 2012 United States House of Representatives elections in New Jersey were held on Tuesday, November 6, 2012, and elected the 12 U.S. Representatives from the state of New Jersey, a loss of one seat following the 2010 United States Census. The elections coincided with the elections of other federal and state offices, including a quadrennial presidential election and an election to the U.S. Senate.

Overview

Redistricting
Redistricting in New Jersey is the responsibility of the New Jersey Redistricting Commission, comprising six Democrats and six Republicans. If a majority of the 12 cannot reach an agreement, a neutral 13th person serves as a mediator or tie-breaker. On December 23, 2011, the commission voted 7–6 for a map supported by Republicans.

District 1

In redistricting, Cherry Hill Township was added to the 1st district, while Riverton and parts of East Greenwich Township and Mantua Township were removed from the district.  Democrat Rob Andrews, who has represented the 1st district since 1990, ran for re-election.

Democratic primary

Candidates

Nominee
 Rob Andrews, incumbent U.S. Representative

Eliminated in primary
 Francis Tenaglio, former Pennsylvania state Representative and candidate for Governor in 2005

Declined
 Donald Norcross, state senator
 Frank Minor, Mayor of Logan Township

Primary results

Republican primary

Candidates

Nominee
 Gregory Horton, athletic director of Clearview Regional High School

Primary results

General election

Endorsements

Results

District 2

In redistricting, Barnegat Light, Bass River Township, Beach Haven, Eagleswood Township, Harvey Cedars, Little Egg Harbor, Long Beach Township, Ship Bottom, Stafford Township, Surf City, Tuckerton, Washington Township and part of Mantua Township were added to the district.  Republican Frank LoBiondo, who represented the 2nd district since 1995, sought re-election.

David W Bowen Sr., a Businessman, a Real Estate Investor and Public Speaker, ran as an Independent.

Cassandra Shober, an office manager, won the Democratic nomination.

Republican primary

Candidates

Nominee
 Frank LoBiondo, incumbent U.S. Representative

Eliminated in primary
 Mike Assad, Absecon Board of Education member

Primary results

Democratic primary

Candidates

Nominee
 Cassandra Shober, office manager

Eliminated in primary
 Viola Hughes, former mayor of Fairfield Township and nominee for this seat in 2006
 Gary Stein, candidate for the General Assembly in 2011

Declined
 Lou Greenwald, Majority Leader of the New Jersey General Assembly
 Jeff Van Drew, state senator
 Jim Whelan, state senator

Primary results

General election

Endorsements

Polling

Results

District 3

In redistricting, the 3rd district was made more favorable to Republicans. Parts of Burlington County, including Riverton and Shamong Township, and Brick Township and Mantoloking in Ocean County were added to the district, while Cherry Hill and Bass River were removed. Republican Jon Runyan, who has represented the 3rd district since January 2011, sought re-election.

Frederick John LaVergne of Delanco, New Jersey, ran as a "Democratic-Republican" Democratic-Republican Party - the party designation of Jefferson, Madison, Monroe, and John Quincy Adams.

Robert Witterschein, an accountant, ran as an Independent.

Republican primary

Candidates

Nominee
 Jon Runyan, incumbent U.S. Representative

Declined
 Justin Murphy, former Tabernacle Township Committee Member and candidate for this seat in 2010

Primary results

Democratic primary
Former U.S. Representative John Adler, who represented the 3rd district from 2009 until 2011 but lost re-election in 2010, had planned to run again; however, Adler died in April 2011. Shelley Adler, an of counsel attorney and the widow of the former congressman, ran unopposed for the Democratic nomination. Thomas Sacks-Wilner, a medical doctor who was considering a bid for the Democratic nomination, declined to run.

Candidates

Nominee
 Shelley Adler, attorney and the widow of former U.S. Representative John Adler

Declined
 Thomas Sacks-Wilner, physician

Primary results

General election

Endorsements

Polling

Predictions

Results

District 4

In redistricting, the district lost all of its share of Burlington County, while gaining more of Republican-leaning Monmouth. Republican Chris Smith, who has represented the 4th congressional district since 1981, sought re-election.

Republican primary

Candidates

Nominee
 Chris Smith, incumbent U.S. Representative

Eliminated in primary
 Terrence McGowan, retired firefighter, police officer, and Navy SEAL

Primary results

Democratic primary

Candidates

Nominee
 Brian Froelich, retired executive and business consultant

Withdrew
 Patricia Bennett, attorney
 Doug DeMeo

Primary results

General election

Endorsements

Results

District 5

Republican Scott Garrett, who has represented the 5th district since 2003, successfully sought re-election.  Michael Cino, an oil executive who challenged Garrett in the Republican primary in 2006, will run again. Garret won the Republican primary by a fairly comfortable margin.

Jason Castle, an it executive and Marine; Adam Gussen, the deputy mayor of Teaneck; and Diane Sare, all ran for the Democratic nomination to challenge Garrett. Gussen eventually won the primary. 

Patricia Alessandrini ran as a candidate of the Green Party for the seat.

Mark Quick, a former member of the Warren County Republican Committee who challenged Garrett as an Independent in 2010, had stated that he would as a candidate of the Reform Party of New Jersey. He withdrew from the race and did not qualify for the ballot.

Republican primary

Candidates

Nominee
 Scott Garrett, incumbent U.S. Representative

Eliminated in primary
 Michael Cino, oil executive and candidate for this seat in 2006
 Bonnie Somer, chorus director and LaRouche political organizer,

Primary results

Democratic primary

Candidates

Nominee
 Adam Gussen, deputy mayor of Teaneck

Eliminated in primary
 Jason Castle, IT executive and Marine
 Diane Sare, LaRouche movement activist

Withdrew
 Terry Duffy, director of Passaic County Board of Chosen Freeholders (Withdrew March 12)

Declined
 Harry Carson, former New York Giants linebacker
 Robert M. Gordon, state senator
 Leo McGuire, former Bergen County Sheriff
 Jim McQueeny, public relations executive and former News12 anchor
 Steve Rothman, incumbent U.S. Representative for the 9th district (running in the 9th district)
 Connie Wagner, Member of the General Assembly

Primary results

General election

Endorsements

Predictions

Results

District 6

Democrat Frank Pallone, who has represented the 6th district since 1993 (and previously represented the 3rd district from 1988 until 1993), will seek re-election. 

Anna Little, the former mayor of Highlands, who unsuccessfully challenged Pallone as the Republican nominee in 2010, won the Republican nomination to challenge Pallone.

Democratic primary

Candidates

Nominee
 Frank Pallone, incumbent U.S. Representative

Primary results

Republican primary

Candidates

Nominee
 Anna Little, former mayor of Highlands and nominee for this seat in 2010

Eliminated in primary
 Ernesto Cullari, small-business owner and orthopedic practitioner

Primary results

General election

Endorsements

Results

District 7

Republican Leonard Lance, who has represented the 7th district since 2009, ran for re-election.  The 7th district was made more favorable to Republicans in redistricting, losing all of Democratic leaning Middlesex County, while now including all of heavily Republican Hunterdon. 

State Assemblyman Upendra J. Chivukula ran unopposed for the Democratic nomination. 

At least two other candidates had announced in 2011 that they would seek the Democratic nomination, but withdraw in the months before the filing deadline: Jun Choi, the former mayor of Edison, and Ed Potosnak, a chemistry teacher and entrepreneur who unsuccessfully ran for the seat in 2010. Following the redistricting process which placed Choi's town of Edison in the 6th district, Choi announced that he would not be a candidate for Congress in 2012 and endorsed incumbent Frank Pallone. On January 16, 2012, Potosnak announced that he was dropping out of the race to accept a position as executive director of the New Jersey League of Conservation Voters.

Patrick McKnight ran as the Libertarian candidate.

Republican primary

Candidates

Nominee
 Leonard Lance, incumbent U.S. Representative

Eliminated in primary
 David Larsen, businessman and candidate for this seat in 2010

Primary results

Democratic primary

Candidates

Nominee
 Upendra J. Chivukula, Member of the General Assembly

Withdrew
 Jun Choi, former mayor of Edison (Withdrew December 2011)
 Ed Potosnak, chemistry teacher entrepreneur and candidate for this seat in 2010 (Withdrew January 16)

Primary results

General election

Endorsements

Predictions

Results

District 8

The new 8th district is the successor to the 13th district. Democrat Albio Sires, who has represented the 13th district since 2006, will seek re-election in this district.

Democratic primary

Candidates

Nominee
 Albio Sires, incumbent U.S. Representative for the 13th District

Eliminated in primary
 Michael Shurin, computer programmer

Primary results

Republican primary

Candidates

Nominee
 Maria Karczewski, former Bayonne Local Redevelopment Authority commissioner

Withdrew
 Anthony Zanowic, independent candidate for the 13th district in 2010
 Washington Flores

Primary results

General election

Endorsements

Results

District 9

Bill Pascrell, a Democrat who had represented the 8th district since 1997, and Steve Rothman, a Democrat who had represented the 9th district since 1997, both ran for the nomination in the new 9th district.

Democratic primary

Candidates

Nominee
 Bill Pascrell, incumbent U.S. Representative for the 8th District

Eliminated in primary
 Steve Rothman, incumbent U.S. Representative

Declined
 Michael Wildes, former mayor of Englewood (Endorsed Rothman)

Endorsements

Primary results

Republican primary

Candidates

Nominee
 Shmuley Boteach, rabbi, author, and radio talk show host

Eliminated in primary
 Blase Billack, pharmaceutical sciences associate professor at St. John's University
 Hector Castillo, ophthalmologist and independent candidate for Governor in 2005

Primary results

General election

Campaign
In the general election, Pascrell faced Rabbi Shmuley Boteach. Pascrell raised more money than any other congressional candidate in the nation in 2012, $2.6 million, 10x what Boteach raised.

Endorsements

Predictions

Results
Pascrell won in the overwhelmingly Democratic district, where Democrats outnumbered Republicans by 3-to-1, by a margin of 73.6% to 25.4%.

District 10

Democrat Donald M. Payne, who had represented the 10th district since 1989, died on March 6, 2012.  As a matter of convenience and cost saving, a special election will be held in conjunction with the regularly-scheduled November general election. Voters will be asked on the November ballot to select two candidates: one to serve the remainder of Payne's term in November and December, and the other candidate to serve the full 2-year term beginning in January 2013.

On June 5, 2012, in the Democratic primary for the special election, Payne's son, Donald Payne Jr., defeated Ronald C. Rice (son of State Senator Ronald Rice) and Irvington Mayor Wayne Smith. In the Democratic primary for the full term, held on the same day, Payne Jr. competed against Rice, Smith, State Senator Nia Gill, Cathy Wright, and Dennis Flynn. He won in a landslide, garnering 60 percent of the vote. Rice received 19 percent, Gill 17 percent, and Smith, Flynn and Wright combined for about 5 percent of the vote.

In the general election held on November 6, 2012, Payne Jr. defeated Republican candidate Brian Kelemen and independent Joanne Miller for the special election to fill the remainder of his father's term.

Democratic primary

Candidates

Nominee
 Donald Payne Jr., president of the Newark Municipal Council, member of the Essex County Board of Chosen Freeholders, and son of former U.S. Representative Donald M. Payne

Eliminated in primary
 Nia Gill, state senator
 Ronald C. Rice, member of the Newark Municipal Council
 Wayne Smith, Mayor of Irvington
 Dennis Flynn, Iraq War veteran
 Cathy Wright, sales support manager

Primary results

Republican primary

Candidates

Nominee
 Brian Kelemen

Primary results

General election

Endorsements

Results

District 11

Republican Rodney Frelinghuysen, who has represented the 11th district since 1995, will seek re-election.

Republican primary

Candidates

Nominee
 Rodney Frelinghuysen, incumbent U.S. Representative

Primary results

Democratic primary

Candidates

Nominee
 John Arvanites, former mayor of Roseland

Primary results

General election

Endorsements

Results

District 12

Democrat Rush Holt, who has represented the 12th district since 1999, will seek re-election. 

Kenneth J. Cody who ran in this district in 2010 will run again as an independent candidate.

Democratic primary

Candidates

Nominee
 Rush Holt, incumbent U.S. Representative

Primary results

Republican primary

Candidates

Nominee
 Eric Beck, businessman and former New Jersey director of the Concord Coalition

Declined
Scott Sipprelle, venture capitalist and nominee for this seat in 2010

Primary results

General election

Endorsements

Results

See also
 United States House of Representatives elections, 2012
 United States elections, 2012

References

External links
Elections from the New Jersey Secretary of State
United States House of Representatives elections in New Jersey, 2012 at Ballotpedia
New Jersey U.S. House at OurCampaigns.com
Campaign contributions for U.S. Congressional races in New Jersey at OpenSecrets
Outside spending at the Sunlight Foundation

New Jersey
2012
United States House